Greg Wencel (born March 17, 1979) is a celebrity hair and makeup artist.

Big Break
Greg was discovered by the Editor-in-not-Chief of FASHION Magazine, Ceri Marsh.  He got his first break while doing make-up for Canada's Next Top Model, where he worked alongside Jeanne Beker and Jay Manuel.  Originally, he was hired to do the print campaign for the television show.  While doing the hair and make-up for the show's host, Tricia Helfer, she loved his work so much that she hired Greg to be her personal hair and make-up artist for the show.  His talent continued to shine, leading to him being assigned as Creative Director Hair and Makeup for the make-over episode (Episode 2) and all the episodes for the duration of the show.

Career
Greg has appeared as a beauty expert on Entertainment Tonight Canada, FashionTelevision, Star Daily, and eTalk Daily, and he was also the Creative Director Hair and Makeup for the reality television show Canada's Next Top Model, Cycle 1 (CNTM).  During the second episode of CNTM, Greg was the featured Guest Judge, helping to eliminate contestant Dawn Buggins. He has worked with some of the world's most recognizable faces including Carrie-Anne Moss, Chantal Kreviazuk, Fergie, Good Charlotte, Hilary Duff, Katy Perry, Molly Sims, Natasha Bedingfield, Pussycat Dolls, Lady Gaga, Taylor Swift, Robyn, supermodel Coco Rocha, Vogue Japan Editor Anna Dello Russo, Irina Lazareanu, Drew Barrymore and Rachel McAdams, who claimed that Greg gave her "one of the best damn haircuts my head has ever seen!"

He is a regular contributor to FASHION Magazine, FQ, Glow, LouLou, and Vanity Fair.

Greg is the spokesperson for Rimmel London and recently signed on as Canadian Makeup Pro for CoverGirl.

Other ventures
Greg Wencel was also a cofounding partner , shareholder and director of P1M artist management from 2009 to 2020

References

1979 births
Living people
Hairdressers
Canadian make-up artists